Between approximately 1996 and 1998, two men in Southport, Merseyside, England ran a scam to trick people into surrendering socks. They became known individually as the Southport Sockmen.

Steven Bain and Steven Gawthrop would approach people in bars and clubs in Southport and buy the socks off their feet, claiming to be collecting them for charity.  They would also take photos of the socks' owners and carefully keep track of their names and pictures. It later emerged that the men were foot fetishists and were hoarding the socks for their own sexual gratification.

When the men's flat was raided, the police found socks in  piles everywhere around the residence, such that one officer commented it was "like an explosion in a sock factory". The socks were thought to number 10,000. Bain and Gawthrop were jailed and eventually sectioned under the mental health act.

Whilst in prison the pair got a job working in the prison laundry cleaning prisoners' socks.

References

Foot fetishism
Southport
Socks
Confidence tricksters
Crime in England